Worse is better (also called the New Jersey style) is a term conceived by Richard P. Gabriel in an essay of the same name to describe the dynamics of software acceptance. It refers to the argument that software quality does not necessarily increase with functionality: that there is a point where less functionality ("worse") is a preferable option ("better") in terms of practicality and usability. Software that is limited, but simple to use, may be more appealing to the user and market than the reverse.

As to the oxymoronic title, Gabriel calls it a caricature, declaring the style bad in comparison with "The Right Thing". However he also states that "it has better survival characteristics than the-right-thing" development style and is superior to the "MIT Approach" with which he contrasted it.

The essay was included into the 1994 book The UNIX-HATERS Handbook, and has been referred to as the origin of the notion of a conceptual split between developers on the east and west coasts of the United States.

Origin 

Gabriel was a Lisp programmer when he formulated the concept in 1989, presenting it in his essay "Lisp: Good News, Bad News, How to Win Big". A section of the article, titled "The Rise of 'Worse is Better, was widely disseminated beginning in 1991, after Jamie Zawinski found it in Gabriel's files at Lucid Inc. and emailed it to friends and colleagues.

Characteristics

New Jersey style 
In The Rise of Worse is Better, Gabriel identified a "Worse is Better" (also the "New Jersey style" or "east coast") model of software design and implementation which has the characteristics (in approximately descending order of importance):

 Simplicity The design must be simple, both in implementation and interface. It is more important for the implementation to be simple than the interface. Simplicity is the most important consideration in a design.
 Correctness The design should be correct in all observable aspects. It is slightly better to be simple than correct.
 Consistency The design must not be overly inconsistent. Consistency can be sacrificed for simplicity in some cases, but it is better to drop those parts of the design that deal with less common circumstances than to introduce either complexity or inconsistency in the implementation.
 Completeness The design must cover as many important situations as is practical. All reasonably expected cases should be covered. Completeness can be sacrificed in favor of any other quality. In fact, completeness must be sacrificed whenever implementation simplicity is jeopardized. Consistency can be sacrificed to achieve completeness if simplicity is retained; especially worthless is consistency of interface.

The MIT approach 
Gabriel contrasted his philosophy with what he called the "MIT/Stanford style of design" or "MIT approach" (also known as the "west coast" approach or "the Right Thing"), which he described as:

 Simplicity The design must be simple, both in implementation and interface. It is more important for the interface to be simple than the implementation.
 Correctness The design must be correct in all observable aspects. Incorrectness is simply not allowed.
 Consistency The design must be consistent. A design is allowed to be slightly less simple and less complete to avoid inconsistency. Consistency is as important as correctness.
 Completeness The design must cover as many important situations as is practical. All reasonably expected cases must be covered. Simplicity is not allowed to overly reduce completeness.

Gabriel argued that early Unix and C, developed by Bell Labs, are examples of the worse-is-better design approach. He also calls them "the ultimate computer viruses".

Effects 

Gabriel argued that "Worse is better" produced more successful software than the MIT approach: As long as the initial program is basically good, it will take much less time and effort to implement initially and it will be easier to adapt to new situations. Porting software to new machines, for example, becomes far easier this way. Thus its use will spread rapidly, long before a program developed using the MIT approach has a chance to be developed and deployed (first-mover advantage). Once it has spread, there will be pressure to improve its functionality, but users have already been conditioned to accept "worse" rather than the "right thing":

Gabriel credits Jamie Zawinski for excerpting the worse-is-better sections of "Lisp: Good News, Bad News, How to Win Big" and e-mailing them to his friends at Carnegie Mellon University, who sent them to their friends at Bell Labs, "who sent them to their friends everywhere." He apparently connected these ideas to those of Richard Stallman and saw related ideas that are important in the design philosophy of Unix, and more generally in the open-source movement, both of which were central to the development of Linux.

In December 2000 Gabriel answered his earlier essay with one titled Worse Is Better Is Worse under the pseudonym Nickieben Bourbaki (an allusion to Nicolas Bourbaki), while also penning Is Worse Really Better?, applying the concept to C++'s success in the field of object-oriented programming despite the existence of more elegant languages designed around the concept.

The UNIX-HATERS Handbook includes Worse is Better as an appendix, and frames the concept in terms of worse-is-better in the form of Unix being "evolutionarily superior" to its competition.

See also 

 Gresham's Law
 Less is more
 Minimum viable product
 Perfect is the enemy of good
 Progressive disclosure
 Satisficing
 Rule of least power

References 

English phrases
Software development philosophies
Software design
Programming principles
Quality management